Heinrich IV, Prince Reuss (26 October 1919 – 20 June 2012) was the head of the German formerly noble House of Reuss.

Life

He was born in Ernstbrunn, Austria, the son of Prince Heinrich XXXIX Reuss and Countess Antonia of Castell-Castell. Heinrich IV became head of the princely family after the previous Prince Heinrich XLV went missing in 1945 and was declared dead in 1962. He lived with his family at Castle Ernstbrunn in Lower Austria. His son, Prince Heinrich XIV also bought a piece of expropriated property in Eastern Germany.

Marriage and children

On 10 June 1954 the prince married Princess Marie Luise of Salm-Horstmar (1918-2015), daughter of Otto, Prince of Salm-Horstmar and Countess Rosa of Solms-Baruth. They had one son and three daughters:
Heinrich XIV, Prince Reuss of Köstritz (b. 14 July 1955), the current head of the family, married to Baroness Johanna Raitz von Frentz, daughter of Jan, Baron Raitz von Frentz and Baroness Marie-Kunigunde zu Hoenning O'Carroll. They have two sons and two daughters:
Heinrich XXIX, Hereditary Prince Reuss (b. 2 March 1997)
Princess Tatiana Reuss (b. 24 June 2001)
Princess Luise Reuss (b. 5 March 2005)
Prince Heinrich V Reuss (b. 12 January 2012)
Princess Anna Elisabeth Johanette Reuss (b. 29 June 1957)
Princess Karoline Adelma Henriette Anna Elisabeth Reuss (b. 23 June 1959), married to Carl Philipp, Baron von Hohenbuhel gennant Heufler zu Rasen.
Princess Anna Elisabeth Eleonore Reuss (b. 22 July 1962), married to Count Johannes Ferdinand Kinsky von Wchinitz und Tettau.

References

Descendants of Heinrich I von Weida - Website Worldroots.com, Genealogy Archive
The House Reuss - Website Fuerstenfamilien.de (German)
 - from TV channel ORF2 

1919 births
2012 deaths
People from Korneuburg District
Princes of Reuss